The gut–brain axis is the two-way biochemical signaling that takes place between the gastrointestinal tract (GI tract) and the central nervous system (CNS). The term "gut–brain axis" is occasionally used to refer to the role of the gut microbiota in the interplay as well. The "microbiota–gut–brain (MGB or BGM) axis" explicitly includes the role of gut microbiota in the biochemical signaling events that take place between the GI tract and the CNS. Broadly defined, the gut–brain axis includes the central nervous system, neuroendocrine system, neuroimmune systems, the hypothalamic–pituitary–adrenal axis (HPA axis), sympathetic and parasympathetic arms of the autonomic nervous system, the enteric nervous system, vagus nerve, and the gut microbiota.

Chemicals released in the gut by the microbiome can vastly influence the development of the brain, starting from birth. A review  from 2015 states that the microbiome influences the central nervous system by “regulating brain chemistry and influencing neuro-endocrine systems associated with stress response, anxiety and memory function”. The gut, sometimes referred to as the “second brain”, functions off of the same type of neural network as the central nervous system suggesting why it plays a significant role in brain function and mental health.

The bidirectional communication is done by immune, endocrine, humoral and neural connections between the gastrointestinal tract and the central nervous system. More research suggests that the gut microorganisms influence the function of the brain by releasing the following chemicals: cytokines, neurotransmitters, neuropeptides, chemokines, endocrine messengers and microbial metabolites such as "short-chain fatty acids, branched chain amino acids, and peptidoglycans”. The intestinal microbiome can then divert these products to the brain via the blood, neuropod cells, nerves, endocrine cells and more to be determined. The products then arrive at important locations in the brain, impacting different metabolic processes. Studies have confirmed communication between the hippocampus, the prefrontal cortex and the amygdala (responsible for emotions and motivation), which acts as a key node in the gut-brain behavioral axis.

While IBS is the only disease confirmed to be directly influenced by the gut microbiome, many disorders (such as anxiety, autism, depression and schizophrenia) have been linked to the gut-brain axis as well. The impact of the axis, and the various ways in which one can influence it, remains a promising research field which could result in future treatments for psychiatric, age-related, neurodegenerative and neurodevelopmental disorders. For example, according to a study  from 2017, “probiotics have the ability to restore normal microbial balance, and therefore have a potential role in the treatment and prevention of anxiety and depression”.

The first of the brain–gut interactions shown, was the cephalic phase of digestion, in the release of gastric and pancreatic secretions in response to sensory signals, such as the smell and sight of food. This was first demonstrated by Pavlov through Nobel prize winning research in 1904.

Scientific interest in the field had already led to review in the second half of the 20th century. It was promoted further by a 2004 primary research study showing that germ-free (GF) mice showed an exaggerated HPA axis response to stress compared to non-GF laboratory mice.

As of October 2016, most of the work done on the role of gut microbiota in the gut–brain axis had been conducted in animals, or on characterizing the various neuroactive compounds that gut microbiota can produce. Studies with humans – measuring variations in gut microbiota between people with various psychiatric and neurological conditions or when stressed, or measuring effects of various probiotics (dubbed "psychobiotics" in this context) – had generally been small and were just beginning to be generalized. Whether changes to the gut microbiota are a result of disease, a cause of disease, or both in any number of possible feedback loops in the gut–brain axis, remained unclear.

Enteric nervous system 

The enteric nervous system is one of the main divisions of the nervous system and consists of a mesh-like system of neurons that governs the function of the gastrointestinal system; it has been described as a "second brain" for several reasons. The enteric nervous system can operate autonomously. It normally communicates with the central nervous system (CNS) through the parasympathetic (e.g., via the vagus nerve) and sympathetic (e.g., via the prevertebral ganglia) nervous systems. However, vertebrate studies show that when the vagus nerve is severed, the enteric nervous system continues to function.

In vertebrates, the enteric nervous system includes efferent neurons, afferent neurons, and interneurons, all of which make the enteric nervous system capable of carrying reflexes in the absence of CNS input. The sensory neurons report on mechanical and chemical conditions. Through intestinal muscles, the motor neurons control peristalsis and churning of intestinal contents. Other neurons control the secretion of enzymes. The enteric nervous system also makes use of more than 30 neurotransmitters, most of which are identical to the ones found in CNS, such as acetylcholine, dopamine, and serotonin. More than 90% of the body's serotonin lies in the gut, as well as about 50% of the body's dopamine; the dual function of these neurotransmitters is an active part of gut–brain research.

The first of the gut–brain interactions was shown to be between the sight and smell of food and the release of gastric secretions, known as the cephalic phase, or cephalic response of digestion.

Gut–brain integration 

The gut–brain axis, a bidirectional neurohumoral communication system, is important for maintaining homeostasis and is regulated through the central and enteric nervous systems and the neural, endocrine, immune, and metabolic pathways, and especially including the hypothalamic–pituitary–adrenal axis (HPA axis). That term has been expanded to include the role of the gut microbiota as part of the "microbiome-gut-brain axis", a linkage of functions including the gut microbiota.

Interest in the field was sparked by a 2004 study (Nobuyuki Sudo and Yoichi Chida) showing that germ-free mice (genetically homogeneous laboratory mice, birthed and raised in an antiseptic environment) showed an exaggerated HPA axis response to stress, compared to non-GF laboratory mice.

The gut microbiota can produce a range of neuroactive molecules, such as acetylcholine, catecholamines, γ-aminobutyric acid, histamine, melatonin, and serotonin, which are essential for regulating peristalsis and sensation in the gut. Changes in the composition of the gut microbiota due to diet, drugs, or disease correlate with changes in levels of circulating cytokines, some of which can affect brain function. The gut microbiota also release molecules that can directly activate the vagus nerve, which transmits information about the state of the intestines to the brain.

Likewise, chronic or acutely stressful situations activate the hypothalamic–pituitary–adrenal axis, causing changes in the gut microbiota and intestinal epithelium, and possibly having systemic effects. Additionally, the cholinergic anti-inflammatory pathway, signaling through the vagus nerve, affects the gut epithelium and microbiota. Hunger and satiety are integrated in the brain, and the presence or absence of food in the gut and types of food present also affect the composition and activity of gut microbiota.

That said, most of the work that has been done on the role of gut microbiota in the gut–brain axis has been conducted in animals, including the highly artificial germ-free mice. As of 2016, studies with humans measuring changes to gut microbiota in response to stress, or measuring effects of various probiotics, have generally been small and cannot be generalized; whether changes to gut microbiota are a result of disease, a cause of disease, or both in any number of possible feedback loops in the gut–brain axis, remains unclear.

The concept is of special interest in autoimmune diseases such as multiple sclerosis. Nutrition and microbiota can influence both each other as well as the immune system, for example by modifying the Th17 and Treg cell frequencies and activity in animal models and preliminary trial in humans.

The history of ideas about a relationship between the gut and the mind dates from the nineteenth century.  The concepts of dyspepsia and neurasthenia gastrica referred to the influence of the gut on human emotions and thoughts.

Gut-brain-skin axis 
A unifying theory that tied gastrointestinal mechanisms to anxiety, depression, and skin conditions such as acne was proposed as early as 1930. In a paper in 1930, it was proposed that emotional states might alter normal intestinal microbiota which could lead to increased intestinal permeability and therefore contribute to systemic inflammation. Many aspects of this theory have been validated since then. Gut microbiota and oral probiotics have been found to influence systemic inflammation, oxidative stress, glycemic control, tissue lipid content, and mood.

Gut microbiota 

The gut microbiota is the complex community of microorganisms that live in the digestive tracts of humans and other animals. The gut metagenome is the aggregate of all the genomes of gut microbiota. The gut is one niche that human microbiota inhabit.

In humans, the gut microbiota has the largest quantity of bacteria and the greatest number of species, compared to other areas of the body. In humans, the gut flora is established at one to two years after birth; by that time, the intestinal epithelium and the intestinal mucosal barrier that it secretes have co-developed in a way that is tolerant to, and even supportive of, the gut flora and that also provides a barrier to pathogenic organisms.

The relationship between gut microbiota and humans is not merely commensal (a non-harmful coexistence), but rather a mutualistic relationship. Human gut microorganisms benefit the host by collecting the energy from the fermentation of undigested carbohydrates and the subsequent absorption of short-chain fatty acids (SCFAs), acetate, butyrate, and propionate. Intestinal bacteria also play a role in synthesizing vitamin B and vitamin K as well as metabolizing bile acids, sterols, and xenobiotics. The systemic importance of the SCFAs and other compounds they produce are like hormones and the gut flora itself appears to function like an endocrine organ; dysregulation of the gut flora has been correlated with a host of inflammatory and autoimmune conditions.

The composition of human gut microbiota changes over time, when the diet changes, and as overall health changes. In general, the average human has over 1000 species of bacteria in their gut microbiome, with Bacteroidetes and Firmicutes being the dominant phyla. Diets higher in processed foods and unnatural chemicals can negatively alter the ratios of these species, while diets high in whole foods can positively alter the ratios. Additional health factors that may skew the composition of the gut microbiota are antibiotics and probiotics. Antibiotics have severe impacts on gut microbiota, ridding of both good and bad bacteria. Without proper rehabilitation, it can be easy for harmful bacteria to become dominant. Probiotics may help to mitigate this by supplying healthy bacteria into the gut and replenishing the richness and diversity of the gut microbiota. There are many strains of probiotics that can be administered depending on the needs of a specific individual.

Bile acids and cognitive function

Microbial derived secondary bile acids produced in the gut may influence cognitive function.  Altered bile acid profiles occur in cases of mild cognitive impairment and Alzheimer’s disease with an increase in cytotoxic secondary bile acids and a decrease in primary bile acids.  These findings suggest a role of the gut microbiome in the progression to Alzheimer’s disease. In contrast to the cytotoxic effect of secondary bile acids, the bile acid tauroursodeoxycholic acid may be beneficial in the treatment of neurodegenerative diseases.

References 

Gut flora
Digestive system
Bacillota
Environmental microbiology
Brain
Microbiomes
Parkinson's disease